The War memorial of Céret is a World War I memorial in France, located in Céret (Pyrénées-Orientales). The memorial is made of light gray sandstone and consists of a symbolic figure of a mourning woman seated on top of an inscribed base. The figure was sculpted by Aristide Maillol, who worked on it from 1919 to 1920. The memorial was inaugurated in 1922, and i was declared a national monument in 1994.

References

World War I memorials in France
Céret
Buildings and structures in Pyrénées-Orientales
Outdoor sculptures in France
Sculptures by Aristide Maillol
Sculptures of women
1920 sculptures
1922 sculptures
Monuments historiques of Pyrénées-Orientales